Quinn v Leathem [1901] UKHL 2, is a case on economic tort and is an important case historically for British labour law. It concerns the tort of "conspiracy to injure". The case was a significant departure from previous practices, and was reversed by the Trade Disputes Act 1906. However, the issue of secondary action was later restricted from the Employment Act 1980, and now the Trade Union and Labour Relations (Consolidation) Act 1992. The case was heavily controversial at the time, and generated a large amount of academic discussion, notably by Wesley Newcomb Hohfeld, which continued long after it was overturned.

Facts
A trade union called the Belfast Journeymen Butchers' and Assistants' Association had wanted to enforce a closed shop agreement against Leathem's butcher business in Lisburn. They approached one of his customers, Andrew Munce in Belfast, and told him that he should refuse to trade with Leathem unless Leathem employed only workers who joined the trade union. They said that if Munce did not do as they wished, they would call a strike among Munce's own workers. Munce had been buying Leathem's beef for 20 years, but there had been no written contract about it, and none of Munce's workers had yet been induced to strike (break their contracts).

Leathem suffered considerable loss to his business, and brought an action for conspiracy. Lord Justice FitzGibbon instructed the jury that the crucial question was whether the defendants' dominant motive had been to injure the plaintiff. The jury found for the plaintiff and awarded him £200 damages.

Judgment
The defendants moved in the Queen's Bench Division of the Irish High Court for a new trial: the application was rejected by a majority, with a notable dissenting judgment from Chief Baron Christopher Palles. The decision of the High Court was affirmed by the Irish Court of Appeal, and the case proceeded to the House of Lords.

The House of Lords held that there was a "conspiracy to injure", which consisted of the intention to cause harm to others. It is perfectly lawful for one person acting alone to attempt that. However, if it is two or more, it suddenly becomes unlawful, and liability in tort follows: "It is a violation of legal right to interfere with contractual relations recognised by law if there be no sufficient justification for the interference".

Lord Lindley gave the following judgment.

Significance
Quinn v Leathem formed a judicial reaction to the increasing activism of trade unions, together with the Taff Vale case. It was one reason for the formation of the UK Labour Party, and the case was overturned by Parliament in the Trade Disputes Act 1906 following the next general election.

Philosophically, the reasoning of Lord Lindley was criticised by WN Hohfeld in his influential discussion of types of rights, liberties and duties. In Hohfeld's view, the House of Lords judgment presumed illegitimately that Leathem had a right to conduct his business without any interference from third parties. Properly stated, Leathem was at liberty to do this, but this did not create any duty upon Quinn and the other workers to abstain from industrial action.

It is noteworthy that when the case was before the Irish High Court, Chief Baron Christopher Palles, who was an acknowledged master of the law of tort, differed from the majority of his colleagues in finding that the defendants' conduct was perfectly legal; according to his analysis of the precedents, a request that a businessman should deal only with customers who use union labour is lawful in itself, and whether the request is made by one person or several is irrelevant. The House of Lords admitted that this argument has a certain "inflexible logic", but declined to follow it.

See also

British labour law
English tort law

Notes

References
J McIlroy, ‘The Belfast Butchers: Quinn v Leathem after a Hundred Years’ in KD Ewing and J Hendy, ''The Right to Strike: from the Trade Disputes Act 1906 to a Trade Union Freedom Bill 2006' (IER 2007) ch 3
WN Hohfeld, 'Some fundamental legal conceptions as applied in judicial reasoning' (1913) 23 Yale Law Journal 16, 42 ff

English tort case law
Irish case law
United Kingdom labour case law
Lord Lindley cases
House of Lords cases
1901 in case law
1901 in British law
United Kingdom trade union case law